Baoshan Road is a station shared between Lines 3 and 4 on the Shanghai Metro. It is located in the former Zhabei District, now part of Jing'an District, and is the northernmost station shared between these lines.

Station Layout

References

Shanghai Metro stations in Jing'an District
Line 3, Shanghai Metro
Line 4, Shanghai Metro
Railway stations in China opened in 2000
Railway stations in Shanghai